The Anniversary (Ngày Giỗ) is a 2003 live-action short film written, edited and directed by Ham Tran, about two Vietnamese brothers who meet each other in the Vietnam War. The short film won 25 international awards for Best Short Film and was among the semi-finalists for the 2004 Academy Award.

References

External links

2003 films
2003 short films
Vietnamese independent films
Vietnamese short films
Films about Vietnamese Americans
Films directed by Ham Tran
Vietnamese war films